Spodnje Jezersko (literally, 'Lower Jezersko') is a settlement in the Municipality of Jezersko in Slovenia. It is part of the traditional region of Carinthia and the Upper Carniola Statistical Region.

Geology
On the left bank of the Kokra River, about 2 km south of the settlement, thick layers of travertine are occasionally still mined, particularly for restoration of listed buildings in Upper Carniola, where it was traditionally used as a building material.

Chapel

A masonry chapel dedicated to Saint Hubertus stands on a hill in the southern part of the settlement, in the hamlet of Zgornje Fužine. It is a single-nave structure with a belfry that was built in the Gothic Revival style in 1853. The chapel contains wooden furnishings and an oil painting of Saint Hubertus.

References

External links

Spodnje Jezersko on Geopedia

Populated places in the Municipality of Jezersko